Peristerona is a village located in the Famagusta District of Cyprus,  south of Lefkoniko, in the Mesaoria plain. The name means "pigeon nest". Peristeronona  is under the de facto control of Northern Cyprus. According to Northern Cyprus, Peristerona is part of Peristeronopigi.

References

Communities in Famagusta District
Populated places in Gazimağusa District